Treacher Collins can refer to:
 Treacher Collins syndrome, a rare genetic disorder characterised by craniofacial deformities. 
 Edward Treacher Collins, the surgeon and ophthalmologist after whom the syndrome was named.